Newton-on-Ayr railway station is a railway station serving the Newton on Ayr neighbourhood in the town of Ayr, South Ayrshire, Scotland. The station is managed by ScotRail and is on the Ayrshire Coast Line.

Station buildings still exist on the southbound platform, but they have been closed to passengers for many years. A footbridge is present here and a small shelter is present on the northbound platform.

Services
Monday to Saturday daytimes there are three trains per hour each way. These run to Ayr and Glasgow Central.

During the evenings and Sundays there is an hourly service each way.

Kilmarnock, Girvan and Stranraer services pass through the station but do not call here.

References

External links 

 Video footage of Newton-on-Ayr railway station

Railway stations in Ayr
Former Glasgow and South Western Railway stations
Railway stations in Great Britain opened in 1839
SPT railway stations
Railway stations served by ScotRail